Vasiliu Tanas (born 2 January 1965) is a Soviet equestrian. He competed in two events at the 1992 Summer Olympics.

References

1965 births
Living people
Soviet male equestrians
Olympic equestrians of the Unified Team
Equestrians at the 1992 Summer Olympics
Place of birth missing (living people)